The Artillery Regiment Marine Division ( are the marines artillery combat support of the Royal Thai Marine Corps and Royal Thai Navy. Military units are supplied troops to support the various branches of the Royal Thai Navy. Even though they are marine artillerymen, but they are trained in combat skills, such as amphibious warfare, jungle combat tactics, living off the jungle, and other skills related to self-defense on the battlefield if the fire base is attacked or attacked while moving. However, they are trained protecting equipment, facilities and operations from threats or hazards in order to preserve operational effectiveness. Marines Artillery Regiment is also one of the forces participating in the mission of the unrest in South Thailand insurgency.

History
On 31 January 1965, Marines Artillery Battalion led forces armed with artillery and light trajectory curve departure from Sattahip, Chonburi to the landing craft mechanized (LCM) at Trat, and then landed on the beach at Khlong Yai District, Trat, to prevent encroachment on the sovereignty of Cambodia so this is a major event and the heroism of the first Marines Artillery role in national defense and established Marines Artillery Regiment until today.

In 2017, 2nd Artillery Battalion, Marines Artillery Regiment is one of the agencies participating in the mission of the unrest in South Thailand insurgency the amphibious landing at Khok Khian, Muang Narathiwat, Marathiwat with HTMS Angthong and HTMS Mankang for shifting troops for the missions in South Thailand insurgency.

Organization
 RTMC: Marines Service Support Regiment 
 RTMC: 1st Artillery Battalion
 RTMC: 2nd Artillery Battalion
 RTMC: Air Defense Artillery Battalion
 RTMC: 4th Artillery Battalion
 RTMC: Artillery Battalion Chanthaburi and Trat defense

Equipment

Field artillery

References

External links
 
 
 

Marine corps units and formations
Artillery regiments
Royal Thai Navy
Military units and formations of Thailand
Military units and formations established in 1965